Peshkovo is a rural locality (a village) in Vozhegodskoye Urban Settlement, Vozhegodsky District, Vologda Oblast, Russia. The population was 1 as of 2002.

Geography 
Peshkovo is located 14 km southwest of Vozhega (the district's administrative centre) by road. Sorozhinskaya is the nearest rural locality.

References 

Rural localities in Vozhegodsky District